Sharon is the name of some places in the U.S. state of Wisconsin:
Sharon, Portage County, Wisconsin, a town
Sharon, Walworth County, Wisconsin, a town
Sharon, Wisconsin, a village